St. John's Episcopal Church is a historic Episcopal church located at Speedsville in Tompkins County, New York. It is timber framed, clapboard-sheathed Federal-style structure built about 1832. It is a three-by-four-bay building and the front facade features a one-stage square belfry. A recessed chancel and service room were added in 1885.

It was listed on the National Register of Historic Places in 2000.

References

Churches on the National Register of Historic Places in New York (state)
Episcopal church buildings in New York (state)
Federal architecture in New York (state)
Churches completed in 1832
19th-century Episcopal church buildings
Churches in Tompkins County, New York
National Register of Historic Places in Tompkins County, New York